Into the Blue is a 1995 album by Guy Barker that was nominated for the Mercury Music Prize. Barker was nominated for this award for a second time in 2002 for his album Soundtrack; however, on both occasions he was unsuccessful.

Track listings
All tracks composed by Guy Barker; except where noted.
"Into the Blue"
"JJ Swing"
"Oh Mr. Rex!"
"Low Down Lullaby" (Leo Robin, Ralph Rainger)
"Did It 'N' Did It"
"The Sphinx" (Ornette Coleman)
"Enigma" (Bernardo Sassetti)
"Ill Wind" (Harold Arlen, Johnny Mercer)
"This is the Life (For Stan Tracey)"
"Weather Bird Rag" (Joe Oliver, Louis Armstrong)

Personnel
Guy Barker - trumpet
Bernardo Sassetti - piano
Alec Dankworth - bass guitar
Ralph Salmins - drums
Sigurður Flosason - saxophone

References

1995 albums
Guy Barker albums
Verve Records albums